Hoplostethus druzhinini is a species of slimehead native to the western Indian Ocean off the coast of Yemen. It lives in deep water between 330m and 445m and can reach sizes of up to 13.1 cm.

References

External links
 

druzhinini
Fish described in 1986
Fish of the Indian Ocean